The Men's 1 km time trial event of the 2016 UCI Track Cycling World Championships was held on 3 March 2016. Joachim Eilers won the gold medal.

Results
The race was started at 14:49.

References

Men's 1 km time trial
UCI Track Cycling World Championships – Men's 1 km time trial